Araujia is a small genus of perennial vines in the dogbane family first described as a genus in 1817. The group is native to South America.

Species
 Araujia angustifolia (Hook. & Arn.) Steud. - Brazil, Paraguay, Uruguay, NE Argentina
 Araujia graveolens (Lindl.) Mast. - Brazil
 Araujia herzogii (Schltr.) Fontella & Goyder - Bolivia
 Araujia hortorum E.Fourn. - Brazil, Paraguay, Uruguay, NE Argentina
 Araujia megapotamica (Spreng.) G.Don - Brazil, Uruguay, NE Argentina
 Araujia plumosa Schltr. - Brazil, Paraguay, Bolivia, NW Argentina
 Araujia sericifera Brot. - white bladderflower, cruel vine - Peru, Brazil; naturalized in parts of South Africa + United States
 Araujia stuckertiana (Kurtz ex Heger) Fontella & Goyder - Cordoba in Argentina
 Araujia subhastata E.Fourn. - Brazil

References

External links 
Jepson Manual Treatment
GRIN Genus Profile

Asclepiadoideae
Apocynaceae genera
Flora of South America